Jorge Fernández Lucas (born 3 February 1992) is a Spanish professional footballer who plays as a left winger.

Club career
Born in Cuenca, Castilla–La Mancha, Fernández represented UB Conquense and CD San José Obrero as a youth. In 2011 he rejoined Conquense, being assigned to the first team in Segunda División B and making his first team debut on 28 August of that year, coming on as a second-half substitute for Adrián Martín in a 0–2 home loss against Real Madrid Castilla.

Fernández scored his first senior goal on 25 September 2011, netting the opener in a 3–3 home draw against CD Leganés, but only featured sparingly as his side suffered relegation. He left the club in 2014, moving to fellow third division side La Roda CF in August of that year.

Fernández continued to appear in the third tier in the following years, representing Coruxo FC, CF Talavera de la Reina, Conquense and CD Castellón. He renewed his contract with the latter until 2022 on 4 February 2020, and contributed with 27 appearances (play-offs included) during the campaign, which ended in promotion to Segunda División.

Fernández made his professional debut on 12 September 2020 at the age of 28, starting in a 2–1 away win against SD Ponferradina.

References

External links

1992 births
Living people
People from Cuenca, Spain
Sportspeople from the Province of Cuenca
Spanish footballers
Footballers from Castilla–La Mancha
Association football wingers
Segunda División players
Primera Federación players
Segunda División B players
Tercera División players
UB Conquense footballers
La Roda CF players
Coruxo FC players
CF Talavera de la Reina players
CD Castellón footballers